Qalacha, is a neighborhood in District 8 of southeastern Kabul, Afghanistan.

The area was home to a cremation ground used by Afghan Hindus and Afghan Sikhs since the 1890s, but has since become a controversy as local Muslims object to cremations on the site.

Qalacha is a rather poor area with an inadequate quality water supply as of 2019.

References

Neighborhoods of Kabul
Hinduism in Kabul
Sikhism in Kabul